Fjørvatnet is a lake along the Norway-Russia border in the Pasvikdalen valley. It is in Sør-Varanger municipality, Norway and in Murmansk Oblast, Russia. It is the core part of the a joint Norwegian and Russian Pasvik Nature Reserve.

References

Bibliography
 

Sør-Varanger
Pechengsky District
Lakes of Murmansk Oblast
Norway–Russia border
Lakes of Troms og Finnmark